The S2 11.0 is a series of American sailboats that was designed by Arthur Edmunds as cruisers and first built in 1977. The designation indicates the approximate length overall in meters.

Production
The series was built by S2 Yachts in Holland, Michigan, United States, between 1977 and 1987, but it is now out of production.

Design
The S2 11.0 is a recreational keelboat, built predominantly of fiberglass, with a balsa-cored deck and wooden trim. It has a masthead sloop rig with aluminum spars, a raked stem, a raised counter reverse transom, an internally mounted spade-type rudder controlled by a wheel and a fixed fin keel.

The boat is fitted with a Universal, Volvo, Pathfinder or Yanmar diesel engine for docking and maneuvering.

Variants
11.0 A
Aft cockpit model, introduced in 1977 and produced until 1987, with 156 built.

The sleeping accommodation includes a forward private bow cabin with a "V"-berth and a main cabin settee berth, with a second "U" settee around the fixed dinette table. The galley is aft and on the port side, at the foot of the companionway steps. The gallery has a two-burner, alcohol-fired stove, plus an oven. The head is on the port side, just aft of the bow cabin. There is also a navigation station aft on the starboard side, opposite the galley.

11.0 C
Center cockpit model, introduced in 1980 and produced until 1987, with 66 built. It uses the same hull and sailplan as the "A" model.

The accommodation includes an aft private cabin, a forward private bow cabin with louvred doors and "V"-berth and two main cabin settee berths around the drop-leaf table. It has sleeping accommodation for six people. The main salon seating area is forward, with the galley aft, on the port side. The gallery has a two-burner, alcohol-fired stove, plus an oven. The head is on the starboard side, opposite the galley, with the companionway steps from the overhead cockpit in between the head and galley. The head includes a shower and bathtub, with pressurized water. There is also a navigation station to starboard, with a seat that swings away over the starboard settee, when not in use. Ventilation is provided by two large windows, two dorade vents and two acrylic hatches. The bow includes a self-draining anchor locker.

For sailing there are two primary winches mounted to the cockpit coamings, plus two halyard winches forward on the cabin roof. The genoa has an adjustable track. The mainsail boom has a 5:1 mechanical advantage outhaul and internal double reefing.

Operational history
In a 1994 review of the 11.0 C Richard Sherwood wrote, "the 11.0 C model ... has the same underwater lines as the 11.0 A. There is substantial weight and a broad beam for stability. The deep keel and rudder help track off the wind. The center cockpit has become very popular for cruisers, and the 11.0 has a big one."

See also
List of sailing boat types

Similar sailboats
C&C 36-1
C&C 36R
Catalina 36
Columbia 36
Coronado 35
Crealock 37
CS 36
Ericson 36
Frigate 36
Hinterhoeller F3
Hunter 36
Hunter 36-2
Hunter 36 Legend
Hunter 36 Vision
Invader 36
Islander 36
Nonsuch 36
Portman 36
Seidelmann 37
Vancouver 36 (Harris)
Watkins 36
Watkins 36C

References

Keelboats
1970s sailboat type designs
Sailing yachts
Sailboat type designs by Arthur Edmunds
Sailboat types built by S2 Yachts